Cliffdiving, cliff diving, cliff-diving or Cliff Diving, may refer to:

Sport
 BASE jumping, skydiving from a cliff
 Cliff jumping, jumping from cliffs with or without equipment
 Diving, diving into water from a cliff 
 High diving, diving into water from a high cliff or other relatively great height
 La Quebrada Cliff Divers, traditional cliff diving in Acapulco, Mexico

Other uses
 "Cliffdiving", a song from the 2006 album When Your Heart Stops Beating by the band +44
 Cliff Diving, a 2012 video game for the PlayStation Vita